Joseph Vijay (born 8 May 1974)  is an Indian lead guitarist from Chennai, Tamil Nadu. He plays guitar mainly in genres such as Jazz, Rock music, and  Contemporary R&B styles of music. He works on musical soundtracks for Gospel Songs, Bollywood, Sandalwood (cinema), Tollywood (Telugu), Kollywood Movies.

Biography 
Joseph Vijay was born in Chennai, Tamil Nadu, India. He is the eldest of four children. He was educated at St. Anglo Indian Higher Secondary School, Chennai, Tamil Nadu. He  married  Camy D'Silva on 30 June 1999 and  has two daughter's Sheena Joseph and Sarina Joseph. He cultivated love towards guitar at tender age of 5, his father was his first Guru who taught him the basics of playing guitar. He started playing in church choirs for Gospel songs when he was 11 years old. Soon his passion over the guitar grew in such a way that he started composing his own tunes which he played in churches. Once member of a band now he is a Solo Artist. He works on a lot of experimental musics and his soul dedication towards composing own music.

Musical career
Joseph Vijay is also known as Vijay Joseph (aka VJ) who joined his first band "Acanthus" which has an official website called "Vin Sinners" between the year 1991-1994 Vinesh 'Vin' Nair formed a Dubai Rock band Vin Sinners which was Acanthus when he first started in Chennai, Vinesh Nair had once mentioned in the news paper  about Joseph Vijay (Vijay Joseph aka VJ) that Nair said fans can expect to hear diverse genres. "You will hear some exceptional players. Many of them are members of leading bands, but the guy to watch out for is VJ. He has done some major gigs across the world and has even worked on movies with AR Rahman." After which joined Raghu Dixit Project. He has also made his first move on creating his teaching of guitar on Dailymotions.com which was even sold on Amazon and in various websites Turning point was when he started his musical journey with Raghu Dixit  project a multilingual folk band from 2007-2011. Alcheringa (festival) at IIT Guwahati was his first concert with Raghu in the same year (2007). Later he has performed in various music festivals, Live concerts "Lungi Rock" with Raghu Dixit. In 2010 he appeared on BBC TV 's Later... with Jools Holland with RaghuDixit. Guitar Virtuosos to unleash their riff in dubai where Joseph Vijay which every one calls him Vijay Joseph (aka VJ) hosted the Show held in Dubai called "Lord of Strings" in the year 2016 which was also published in famous Dubai news paper Khaleejtimes. Lord of strings is a unique show where all the guitarists from Syria, Jordon, India came together on a unique show and Joseph Vijay his fans also address him Vijay Joseph (aka VJ) was the host which gave him grand success. This was the first time he performed in UAE, "You know, I have friends and family in Dubai, but I didn't know the city has so many talented musicians. I'm looking forward to sharing stage with some of them," VJ said to the newspaper. He has performed involving a great number of artist like Karthik (singer), Vijay Prakash, Andrea Jeremiah, Sean Roldan, Vijay Yesudas, Shakthisree Gopalan. He is being working with famous music directors like Harris Jayaraj, Santhosh Narayanan  Leon James, and for movie Karuppan for the song "Usure Usure" for music director D. Imman. He has also worked on many own composing albums like "Pure Nature Sounds". He also have sensationals on Apple iTunes as well. He has done various Live concerts and Stages Shows and has given fever of music with his tunes. Recently he also played Nylon Guitars for the song "Kannamma" from the movie Kaala (2018 film).

Concerts 

 Roots Festival, North East.
 NH Weekender, Mumbai.
 Coke Studio and Dewarist live Concerts in 2011.
Coke Studio Live Jalander
"Waiting for Miracle" with Raghu Dixit  Session on BBC Radio.
Isha Foundation "MahaShivarathri 2018"
Karthik and Friends US tour June 2018

Filmography as musician
Hebbuli
Kaala (2018 film)
Veera (2018 film)
Chakravarthy (2017 film)
Iru Mugan
Kabali (film)
Sethupathi (film)
Meesaya Murukku
Kaashmora
Irudhi Suttru
Madras (film)
Mungaru Male 2
Chowka
Mujhse Fraaandship Karoge
Kavalai Vendam
Tagaru
Bairavaa
Natpe Thunai

References

External links 
Official website
Instagram

1974 births
Living people
Indian guitarists